Sulfoacetaldehyde dehydrogenase (SafD) is an enzyme with systematic name 2-sulfoacetaldehyde:NAD+ oxidoreductase. This enzyme catalyses the following chemical reaction

 2-sulfoacetaldehyde + H2O + NAD+  sulfoacetate + NADH + 2 H+

This reaction is part of a bacterial pathway that can make use the amino group of taurine as a sole source of nitrogen for growth.

References

External links 
 

EC 1.2.1